Marcelle Machluf (Morocco, May 24, 1963) is an israeli biologist.

Biography
Machluf was born in Morocco and moved to Israel with her mother and grandmother when she was one year old. She grew up in Ashdod.  Her mother supported the family as a seamstress and a cleaning lady.

Career
After completing high school and her army service, Machluf applied to medical school, but was not accepted. Instead she decided to study Biology and received a B.Sc. in biology from Hebrew University. She went on to receive her Master of Science and a Ph.D. in biotechnology engineering from Ben-Gurion University of the Negev.  She conducted her postdoctoral research as a fellow at Harvard Medical School, and focused on gene therapy, tissue engineering and the control of drug delivery in cancer therapy.

Currently, Machluf is a Full Professor and the Dean of the Faculty of Biotechnology and Food Engineering at the Technion in Israel, as well as the director of the Laboratory for Cancer Drug Delivery & Cell Based Technologies, where the nanoghost, a modified stem cell to treat metastatic melanoma and mesothelioma, has been developed jointly with the New York University Langone Medical Center.

Her research interests include: Developing nano-particles for the delivery of anti cancer drugs to the brain and other organs; developing nano-delivery system for DNA vaccination; and tissue engineering of heart and its blood vessels using pig heart tissue, under the auspices of Technion's Russell Berrie Nanotechnology Institute (RBNI).

Awards and recognitions
Alon Award for excellence in science, 2004
Gutwirth Award for achievements in the gene therapy field, 2006
Hershel Rich Technion Innovation Award, 2010
Juludan Research Prize For outstanding innovative research, 2014
Selected as one of the 14 torchbearers for the Israeli 70th Independence day ceremony representing national recognition for her contribution to science and education, 2018.

Personal life
Machluf is married to Yigal and has three children.

References

External links
The Lab for Cancer Drug Delivery & Cell Based Technologies - Technion

Hebrew University of Jerusalem alumni
20th-century Moroccan Jews
Israeli people of Moroccan-Jewish descent
People from Haifa
Harvard Medical School people
Academic staff of Technion – Israel Institute of Technology
Living people
Israeli biochemists
Israeli women chemists
Ben-Gurion University of the Negev alumni
1963 births